The South Dakota District is one of the 35 districts of the Lutheran Church–Missouri Synod (LCMS), and comprises the state of South Dakota; one congregation in the state is in the North Dakota District. The South Dakota District includes approximately 108 congregations and missions, subdivided into 11 circuits, as well as 16 preschools, 4 elementary schools and 1 high school. Baptized membership in district congregations is over 23,000.

The South Dakota District was formed in 1906 out of the Minnesota and Dakota District, with the rest of the district continuing to use that name until 1910. District offices are located in Sioux Falls, South Dakota. Delegates from each congregation meet in convention every three years to elect the district president, vice presidents, circuit counselors, a board of directors, and other officers.

Presidents
Rev. August Frederick Breihan, 1906–1912
Rev. Johann Dietrich Ehlen, 1912–1918
Rev. Ernst Gottlieb Jehn, 1918–1921
Rev. Friedrich W. Leyhe, 1921–1936
Rev. Walter Nitschke, 1936–1951
Rev. Philip H. Mueller, 1951–1960
Rev. Elmer O. Luessenhop, 1960–1968
Rev. Leonard Eberhard, 1968–1970
Rev. Arthur J. Crosmer, 1970–1978
Rev. Paul G. Wendling, 1978-1988
Rev. Raymond L. Hartwig, 1988-1998
Rev. Vernon L. Schindler, 1998-2006
Rev. Dale L. Sattgast, 2006-2015
Rev. Scott Sailer, 2015-present

References

External links
South Dakota District web site
LCMS:  South Dakota District
LCMS Congregation Directory
Synodal-Bericht des Minnesota und Dakota Distrikts der Deutschen Evang.-Luth. Synode von Missouri, Ohio und Andern Staaten (1882-1889)
Synodal-Bericht des Minnesota und Dakota Distrikts der Deutschen Evang.-Luth. Synode von Missouri, Ohio und Andern Staaten (1891-1910)

Lutheran Church–Missouri Synod districts
Lutheranism in South Dakota
Christian organizations established in 1906
1906 establishments in South Dakota